The 2022–23 BBL-Pokal was the 56th season of the BBL-Pokal, the domestic cup competition of the Basketball Bundesliga (BBL).

Bayern Munich defeated Baskets Oldenburg in the final for their fourth title.

Participants
The sixteen highest placed teams from the 2021–22 Basketball Bundesliga, without the relegated teams and promoted teams, qualified for the tournament.

Standings

Round of 16
The games took place between 15 and 17 October 2022.

Quarterfinals
The draw was held on 17 October 2022. The games took place on 3 and 4 December 2022.

Final four
The draw was held on 4 December 2022. The games took place on 18 and 19 February 2023.

Bracket

Semifinals

Final

References

External links
Official website

BBL-Pokal seasons
2022–23 in European basketball